The Sex/Work Strike began in 2018 as part of the International Women's Strike on International Women's Day with the aims of decriminalisation of sex work. Participants included the writer Molly Smith author of Revolting Prostitutes
In 2019 it was supported by many groups including the English Collective of Prostitutes, x:talk, United Voices of the World (USW), East London Strippers Collective, Sisters Uncut Edinburgh, London, Class War and Young Greens.

Gallery

See also
 2021 Minas Gerais prostitute strike
 International Union of Sex Workers
 Occupation of Saint-Nizier church by Lyon prostitutes
 Sex workers' rights

References

Further reading
 International Women’s Day 2020: Why sex workers are going on strike. i (newspaper). Author – Frankie Miren. Published 8 March 2020.
 Why sex workers went on strike this week. Dazed. Author – Emma Garland. Published 9 March 2022.
 Sex/Work Strike: 8th March 2022 (London). National Ugly Mugs (NUM).

Labour disputes in the United Kingdom
Leicester Square
Prostitution in the United Kingdom
Sex workers' rights
Women's protests